Wang ocheonchukguk jeon (pinyin: wǎng wǔ tiānzhú guó zhuàn; "An account of travel to the five Indian kingdoms") is a travelogue by Buddhist monk Hyecho, who traveled from Korea to India, in the years 723 - 727/728 CE.

Overview
Written in Classical Chinese, the lingua franca of East Asia at the time, the work was long thought to be lost. However, a manuscript turned up among the Dunhuang manuscripts during the early 20th century. It was bought by French explorer and archaeologist Paul Pelliot in 1908, and is now owned by the National Library of France. 

The manuscript scroll contains 5,893 classical Chinese characters in 227 lines.  It originally consisted of three volumes, however volume one and later section of volume three are lost. It is 28.5 centimeters in width and 358.6 centimeters in length, is the first known overseas travelogue written in Chinese by a Korean and contains information about the political, cultural and economic customs of India and central Asia at that time.  The five Indian kingdoms in the work's title refer to West, East, North, South and Central India, This scroll is estimated as the first East Asian travelogue to the Hindu world. Jeong and other scholars states his westernmost destination was Nishapur, which was a city  But it also contains information about the Byzantine Empire (Greater Fu-lin), and several Central Asian states. 

It was loaned to the National Museum of Korea and went on display there from Dec. 18, 2010 to April 3, 2011, 1283 years after the document was first written.

Excerpt: Hyecho on Kapiśa/Jibin (paragraph 22)
One of the important excerpts from Hyecho's work relates to his visit Jibin (Kapisa) in 726 CE: for example, he reports that the country was ruled by a Turk King, thought to be one of the Turk Shahis, and that his Queen and dignitaries practice Buddhism (三寶, "Triratna"):

Excerpt: Hyecho on Gandhara (paragraph 18)

References
Notes

Bibliography

Yang, Han-sung et al. (1984). The Hye Cho's Diary: Memoir of the Pilgrimage to the Five Regions of India (1984). Translation, text and editing by Yang, Han-sung et al. Religions of Asia series (Berkeley, Calif.); no. 2. UNESCO Collection of Representative Works. Berkeley, Calif.: Asian Humanities Press; Seoul: Po Chin Chai. .

External resources
Fully digitized "Wang ocheonchukguk jeon" on International Dunhuang Project website

Korean Buddhist texts
Travel books
Pilgrimage accounts
8th-century texts
Dunhuang manuscripts
Bibliothèque nationale de France collections
Chinese-language literature of Korea
History books about India